Solid is a 1974 album recorded by the Groundhogs, originally released by WWA Records. It was arranged, composed, engineered and produced by band member Tony McPhee.  It entered the UK album charts in July 1974 reaching number 31 but remained in the charts for only one week.

Track listing
All tracks composed by Tony McPhee

 "Light My Light" - 6:23
 "Free from All Alarm" - 5:14
 "Sins of the Father" - 5:29
 "Sad Go Round"  -  2:55
 "Corn Cob" - 5:36
 "Plea Sing, Plea Song" - 3:00
 "Snow Storm" - 3:28
 "Joker's Grave" - 8:41

Personnel
The Groundhogs
Tony McPhee – guitars, vocals
Peter Cruikshank – bass
Ken Pustelnik, Clive Brooks – drums
Technical
Martin Birch - engineer
Gered Mankowitz - photography

Reception
Allmusic  [ link]

References

1974 albums
The Groundhogs albums
Vertigo Records albums